Klucznik  is a village in the administrative district of Gmina Barczewo, within Olsztyn County, Warmian-Masurian Voivodeship, in northern Poland.

The village has a population of 80.

Notable residents
Otto Parschau (1890-1916) World War I pilot, helped test the pioneering version of the synchronization gear with Anthony Fokker

References

Klucznik